The Wright Model A was an early aircraft produced by the Wright Brothers in the United States beginning in 1906. 
It was a development of their Flyer III airplane of 1905. The Wrights built about seven Model As in their bicycle shop during the period 1906–1907, in which they did no flying. One of these was shipped to Le Havre in 1907 in order to demonstrate it to the French. The Model A had a  engine and seating for two with a new control arrangement. Otherwise, it was identical to the 1905 airplane. The Model A was the first aircraft that they offered for sale, and the first aircraft design to enter serial production anywhere in the world. Apart from the seven machines the Wrights built themselves in 1906–1907, they sold licences for production in Europe with the largest number of Model A's actually being produced in Germany by Flugmaschine Wright GmbH, which built about 60 examples.

The 1909 Military Flyer was a one-of-a-kind Model A built by the Wright Brothers. With wings shortened two feet, higher skid undercarriage and the same engine salvaged from the 1908 Wright Military Flyer wrecked at Fort Myer, it differed from the standard Wright A in size and had a faster speed. After rigorous trials the Signal Corps accepted the airplane as "Signal Corps (S.C.) No. 1", August 2, 1909, and paid the brothers $30,000 ($ in 2022 US dollars).

Designation
The aircraft were not referred to as 'Model A' by the Wrights, but the term was likely created by the U. S. Army after purchasing a Flyer of 1909 and purchasing later Model B's. At different times prior to 1909 the aircraft were called the following: 'Wilbur Wright machine', 'Wright 1905 Flyer', and by later surviving Wright pilots and personnel 'twin-propellered Wright with head' ('the head' referring to the front elevator). As more Wright models were built after 1910 their natural designations became B, C, D etc. to differentiate one model from the other. Later aviation historians and biographers continued with 'Model A' in providing a chronological timeline for each of the different model of Wright aircraft.

Individual control arrangement

Wilbur and Orville devised slightly different flight controls in the Model A airplanes they flew separately in France and the United States for their 1908 and 1909 public demonstrations. The Smithsonian's National Air and Space Museum refers to "The Wilbur Method" and "The Orville Method". In Wilbur's method, the roll and yaw controls were combined on the same lever at the pilot's right hand. A forward-backward movement controlled the rudder, while a sideways or left-and-right motion controlled wing-warping. In the Orville Method, moving the stick controlled wing-warping, while a knob atop the stick controlled the rudder. In both methods the left-hand lever operated the forward elevator to control pitch. Wilbur trained French and Italian pilots using his method, and Orville trained German pilots while in Germany in 1909 for the Wright GmbH as well as American pilots at the Wright Company flight school using his method.

Survivors

Wright Flyer III was itself the prototype in 1908. Flyer III was restored in the late 1940s back into its original 1905 configuration.
The original  Wright Military Model A plane (Signal Corps No. 1) is now on display at the National Air and Space Museum in Washington, DC. S.C. No. 1 had been significantly modified by the addition of wheels for landing gear and the movement of the elevators, but was restored by the Wright Company to its original configuration before donation to the museum. It is displayed in much the original condition as when the Smithsonian received it in October 1911. The aircraft was displayed in the National History Museum, then protected in Luray, Virginia during WWII, and is now in the Early Flight gallery in the Air and Space Museum.
The only original standard Model A to survive, and the sole surviving original Dayton-built example, is the one Orville Wright used to demonstrate at Tempelhof, Germany, in September 1909. It resides in the Deutsches Museum, Munich.

Reproductions
An exact reproduction of the 1909 Military Flyer is on display in the National Museum of the United States Air Force in Dayton, Ohio. This reproduction was constructed in 1955 by museum personnel. It is equipped with an original engine personally donated for the reproduction by Orville Wright, while the chains, sprockets, and propellers were all donated by the heirs of the Wright estate, and have been added to the replica as they have been received and restored.
In 2008 Ken Hyde built an exact replica of the original 1908 Wright Military Flyer which itself was one of the Dayton 7. This was for the 100th anniversary and remembrance of Orville Wright's first trip to Fort Myer and also the death of Thomas Selfridge. Hyde has said in press reports that his reproduction is flyable but for now it will only exist in static display.

Operators

Aeronautical Division, U.S. Signal Corps

Specifications (Wright Military Flyer)

See also

References
Notes

Bibliography
 aeroflight.co.uk
 United States Air Force Museum (1975 edition)

External links 

 1909 Wright Military Flyer , National Air and Space Museum collections database
 Replica at the National Museum of the United States Air Force
 Under the Hood of a Wright Flyer Smithsonian online version of magazine November 1, 2006
 Engine start Youtube video of Ken Hyde's reproduction 1908 Wright Model A Military Flyer.
 Wright Brother Flight Logs 

1900s United States experimental aircraft
Model A
Single-engined twin-prop pusher aircraft
Aircraft first flown in 1908